"Song for America" is the title track from the second album of American progressive rock band Kansas. It was written by guitarist/keyboardist Kerry Livgren during the period of heavy touring for their first album. The song was released on their 1975 album Song for America, and later released as the band's third single, although it did not chart. It is known for its symphonic structure, and its lyrics showing America's state before and after colonization. The song is one of Kansas' most well-known songs from their period of obscurity, appearing on most of their collections, live albums and DVDs.

Livgren wrote the song while looking down at the country from an airplane.  He said "I was musing over our relatively young nation."

Structure 
The song begins with a 3-minute instrumental overture. It is dominated by keyboards, violin, and bass. It has a symphonic structure. About halfway through the song, there is an extended instrumental section in  time. The final section of the instrumental overture closes the song, over 10 minutes long. The single version of the song had most of the instrumental parts edited out, and is cut down to three minutes.  This version, which was edited by the record label owner Don Kirshner, is available as a bonus track on the remastered version of the album.  The flipside of the 45 featured an instrumental version of the track.

Reception
Cash Box said it features "excellent musicianship and a strong lyric line." Record World said "Not the kind of 100 percent patriotic paean you'd expect the Federal government to commission, but a more believable and dramatic unofficial anthem that carves its own niche into the Bicentennial era."

Classic Rock critic Dave Ling rated "Song for America" as Kansas' 3rd greatest song. Ultimate Classic Rock critic Eduardo Rivadavia rated "Song for America" as Kansas' 4th greatest song, saying it "delivers a state-of-the-union address that spans decades, before and after European colonization."  Classic Rock History critic Brian Kachejian rated it as Kansas' 7th greatest song, calling it "Simply stunning music that is timeless."

Live versions 
Several live versions of the song have been recorded. One is featured on the live Two for the Show that has a piano solo near the end edited out. Kansas also plays it on their 2009 live CD/DVD There's Know Place Like Home with the Washburn University Symphony Orchestra.

Personnel 
Kerry Livgren – keyboards
Steve Walsh – lead vocals, keyboards
Robby Steinhardt – violin, backing vocals
Dave Hope – bass
Phil Ehart – drums
Rich Williams – guitar

References 

Kansas (band) songs
1975 singles
Song recordings produced by Jeff Glixman
Songs written by Kerry Livgren
1975 songs
Songs about the United States